A list of notable people from Jajarkot District, Nepal:

Politics

 Bhakta Bahadur Shah
 Chandra Prakash Gharti
 Kali Bahadur Malla
 Rajeev Bikram Shah
 Shakti Bahadur Basnet

See also
 List of people from Pokhara
 List of people from Kathmandu

References

Jajarkot District